The Smithsonian Astrophysical Observatory (SAO) is a research institute of the Smithsonian Institution, concentrating on astrophysical studies including galactic and extragalactic astronomy, cosmology, solar, earth and planetary sciences, theory and instrumentation, using observations at wavelengths from the highest energy gamma rays to the radio, along with gravitational waves.  Established in Washington, D.C., in 1890, the SAO moved its headquarters in 1955 to Cambridge, Massachusetts, where its research is a collaboration with the Harvard College Observatory (HCO) and the Harvard University Department of Astronomy. In 1973, the Smithsonian and Harvard formalized the collaboration as the Center for Astrophysics | Harvard & Smithsonian (CfA) under a single Director.

History
Samuel Pierpont Langley, the third Secretary of the Smithsonian, founded the Smithsonian Astrophysical Observatory on the south yard of the Smithsonian Castle (on the U.S. National Mall) on March 1,1890. The Astrophysical Observatory's initial, primary purpose was to "record the amount and character of the Sun's heat". Charles Greeley Abbot was named SAO's first director, and the observatory operated solar telescopes to take daily measurements of the Sun's intensity in different regions of the optical electromagnetic spectrum. In doing so, the observatory enabled Abbot to make critical refinements to the Solar constant, as well as to serendipitously discover Solar variability. It is likely that SAO's early history as a solar observatory was part of the inspiration behind the Smithsonian's "sunburst" logo, designed in 1965 by Crimilda Pontes.

In 1955, the scientific headquarters of SAO moved from Washington, D.C. to Cambridge, Massachusetts to affiliate with the Harvard College Observatory (HCO). Fred Lawrence Whipple, then the chairman of the Harvard Astronomy Department, was named the new director of SAO. The collaborative relationship between SAO and HCO therefore predates the official creation of the CfA by 18 years. SAO's move to Harvard's campus also resulted in a rapid expansion of its research program. Following the launch of Sputnik (the world's first human-made satellite) in 1957, SAO accepted a national challenge to create a worldwide satellite-tracking network, collaborating with the United States Air Force on Project Space Track.

With the creation of NASA the following year and throughout the space race, SAO led major efforts in the development of orbiting observatories and large ground-based telescopes, laboratory and theoretical astrophysics, as well as the application of computers to astrophysical problems.

Remote stations
SAO has operated a number of remote stations over the years.

SAO Today

The current director of the SAO is Lisa Kewley (2022 to present). There are currently about 170 research staff working at the SAO, including affiliated research staff.  In addition, the SAO has about 120 postdoctoral researchers/fellows working in five competitive, associated fellowship programs: CfA, Clay, SMA, ITAMP, and Leon Van Speybroeck, or in support of a contract or grant. (Additional postdocs do research via Harvard fellowship programs or national/international fellowship awards); about 40% of the postdoctoral community are women and about 12% are from minority populations.  SAO scientists can supervise Harvard Ph.D students, and in addition they typically supervise about 30 graduate students from other institutions who are pursuing Ph.D. theses at the SAO. About thirty undergraduate students intern at the SAO each year.  All together there are about 950 staff (including administrative and management department employees) working at the Center.

Directors
Samuel Pierpont Langley 1890–1906
Charles Greeley Abbot 1906–1942
Loyal Blaine Aldrich 1942–1955
Fred Lawrence Whipple 1955–1973
George B. Field 1973–1982 (with the creation of the Harvard-Smithsonian Center for Astrophysics in 1973, the director of SAO and the Harvard College Observatory became a joint position)
Irwin I. Shapiro 1982–2004
Charles R. Alcock 2004–2022
Lisa Kewley 2022–

Associates
Margaret Sordahl

See also
 List of astronomical societies

References

External links

SAO homepage
Center for Astrophysics | Harvard & Smithsonian

Buildings and structures in Cambridge, Massachusetts
Astronomical observatories in Massachusetts
Smithsonian Institution research programs
Harvard–Smithsonian Center for Astrophysics
Research institutes in Massachusetts